Clemens Höslinger (pseudonyme: Christian Herbst) (born 15 September 1933) is an Austrian historian, music journalist and librarian.

Life 
Afterwards he worked from 1959 to 1993 as librarian for the National Archives of Austria.

Höslinger became known primarily as a music critic in magazines and daily newspapers in the German-speaking world. He has also presented historical sound recordings at numerous radio stations. His areas of research and publication primarily concern the history of Viennese music and theatre.

Höslinger is vice president of the association , previously .

Writings 
 Musik im Burgtheater. Eine Ausstellung zum 200jährigen Jubiläum des Burgtheaters. sterreichische Nationalbibliothek, VIenna 1976 (Katalog der Musiksammlung der österreichischen Nationalbibliothek, Institut für Österreichische Musikdokumentation)
 Die Wiener Oper zu Zeit des jungen Schönberg.
 Musik-Index zur  1816-1848. Musikverlag Katzbichler, Munich/Salzburg 1980.
 Giacomo Puccini. Mit Selbstzeugnissen und Bilddokumenten.<ref>Giacomo Puccini. Mit Selbstzeugnissen und Bilddokumenten] on WorldCat</ref> (Rowohlts Monographien. Bd. 325). Rowohlt, Reinbek 1984; 8th edition 2008, .
 Book Review: Jacques Offenbachs Hoffmanns Erzählungen. Konzeption, Dokumentation. (Thurnauer Schriften zum Musiktheater. Band 9) Literature 
 Herbst, Christian. In Lutz Hagestedt (ed.): Deutsches Literatur-Lexikon. Das 20. Jahrhundert.'' Vol. 17, De Gruyter, Berlin/Boston 2011,  ([https://books.google.com/books?id=dfDRxuJ-bWYC&pg=PA2008 online).

References

External links 
 

Music historians
Theatrologists
Austrian music critics
Opinion journalists
Austrian librarians
1933 births
Living people
Journalists from Vienna